Polymorphic association is a term used in discussions of Object-Relational Mapping with respect to the problem of representing in the relational database domain, a relationship from one class to multiple classes. In statically typed languages such as Java these multiple classes are subclasses of the same superclass. In languages with duck typing, such as Ruby, this is not necessarily the case.

See also 

 Polymorphism in object-oriented programming
 Hibernate (Java)

References 

Java Persistence with HIBERNATE, Chapter 5, Bauer, Christian & Gavin, King, Manning, copyright 2007,

External links 
 Hibernate Home Page

Data mapping
Object-oriented programming
Relational model